Rubens Fernando Moedim (born 4 August 1982), known as Rubinho, is a Brazilian footballer  who last played as a goalkeeper for Avaí FC.

After starting out at Corinthians in his country of birth, he went on to spend most of his professional career in Italy.

Club career
Having started at Sport Club Corinthians Paulista, São Paulo-born Rubinho played his first four professional seasons there. In January 2006 he signed with Portugal's Vitória de Setúbal, helping the Sadinos achieve a final comfortable eighth position in the Primeira Liga.

Subsequently, Rubinho moved to Italy's Serie B, joining Genoa C.F.C. where he was an undisputed starter from early on, achieving promotion to Serie A in his first season (29 games played). He appeared in the exact number of matches in the following campaign, as the team ranked tenth.

On 6 August 2009, Rubinho joined U.S. Città di Palermo signing a five-year contract, with Marco Amelia, whom occupied the same position, moving in the opposite direction – both players were valued at €5 million. He was loaned out to A.S. Livorno Calcio on February of the following year, after losing his place to young Salvatore Sirigu.

On 29 June 2010, A.C. Chievo Verona initially agreed with Palermo to sign Rubinho on loan, subject to Stefano Sorrentino's sale. The deal eventually collapsed but, on 31 August, he signed for second-tier club Torino F.C., also on loan.

Despite Sirigu refusing to sign a new contract with Palermo and being eventually cast aside, Benussi was used in the 2011–12 UEFA Europa League third qualifying round, which ended in elimination at the hands of FC Thun, and Rubinho even lost his second-choice status for that tie, with Giacomo Brichetto taking his place. On 16 December 2011, he terminated his contract with the club.

On 29 August 2012, after training with Grêmio Barueri Futebol in his country and going on trial with A.S. Varese 1910, even signing with the latter, Rubinho joined Juventus F.C. on a one-year deal. During his spell, he played second-fiddle to Gianluigi Buffon and Marco Storari, although he became known as a key dressing room personality for the Turin side. He made his competitive debut on 18 May 2013, coming on for Storari in the 80th minute of a 2–3 away defeat to U.C. Sampdoria on the final match of the season as the club had already been crowned champions; subsequently, he renewed his contract.

Rubinho made his second appearance for the club on 18 May 2014, coming on for Buffon and keeping a clean sheet in a 3–0 home win over Cagliari Calcio as the Old Lady celebrated another league title under manager Antonio Conte with a record 102 points. In late June 2014, he agreed to another extension.

On 30 August 2015, whilst on the bench of an away fixture against A.S. Roma, Rubinho received a straight red card in the 65th minute of the eventual 1–2 loss for unsportsmen-like conduct. After four seasons with the club, he left Juventus on 30 June 2016 following the expiration of his contract.

After remaining without a club for several months, on 14 December, Rubinho signed a contract with Lega Pro sude Como, which would keep him at the club until the end of the 2016–17 season. On 13 January 2017, however, the club's general director announced that his contract with the club had been cancelled, due to personal reasons. The following day, he signed with his former club Genoa.

On 31 December, Rubinho signed a one–year contract with Avaí in his home country.

International career
Rubinho represented Brazil in the 2001 FIFA World Youth Championship, being first-choice.

Style of play
A reliable and experienced shot-stopper, Rubinho was also known for his leadership and vocal presence in goal, being considered a key dressing room personality for his teams throughout his career. As a goalkeeper, he also stood out for his speed when rushing off his line to collect the ball or anticipate opponents who had beaten the off-side trap, and was known for his ability to get to ground quickly to parry shots. Moreover, he was effective in his distribution and competent with the ball at his feet. In 2009, former goalkeeper Luca Marchegiani considered Rubinho to be me among the best goalkeepers in Italy.

Personal life
Rubinho's older brother, Zé Elias, was also a professional footballer. A midfielder, he played for nearly 15 clubs during 16 years, including Inter Milan.

Honours
Juventus
Serie A: 2012–13, 2013–14, 2014–15, 2015–16
Coppa Italia: 2014–15, 2015–16
Supercoppa Italiana: 2013, 2015
Individual
Toulon Tournament Best Goalkeeper: 2002

References

External links

1982 births
Living people
Footballers from São Paulo
Brazilian footballers
Association football goalkeepers
Campeonato Brasileiro Série A players
Sport Club Corinthians Paulista players
Primeira Liga players
Vitória F.C. players
Serie A players
Serie B players
Genoa C.F.C. players
Palermo F.C. players
U.S. Livorno 1915 players
Torino F.C. players
Juventus F.C. players
Como 1907 players
Brazil youth international footballers
Brazil under-20 international footballers
Brazilian expatriate footballers
Expatriate footballers in Portugal
Expatriate footballers in Italy
Brazilian expatriate sportspeople in Portugal
Brazilian expatriate sportspeople in Italy